Leesburg is an unincorporated community in Fulton County, Illinois, United States. Leesburg is northeast of Astoria. The community is located four miles north of U.S. Route 24 on the Ipava Blacktop (County Rd. 2).

References

Unincorporated communities in Fulton County, Illinois
Unincorporated communities in Illinois